Maissau is a municipality in the district of Hollabrunn in Lower Austria, Austria.

The Villages of the municipality are: Eggendorf am Walde, Grübern, Gumping, Klein-Burgstall, Limberg, Maissau, Oberdürnbach, Reikersdorf, Unterdürnbach and Wilhelmsdorf.

Population

References

External links 

Cities and towns in Hollabrunn District